The 2008–09 Iraqi Premier League was the 35th edition of the competition. It started on 1 November 2008 and ended on 16 July 2009. 27 teams from all over the country competed for the title. Erbil won the title by defeating Al-Najaf in the final via penalty shootout after a goalless draw. It was Erbil's third league title in a row. The two teams would have qualified for the 2010 AFC Cup, but were disqualified due to FIFA's suspension of the Iraq Football Association.

The 2008–09 season is the only season in history where none of the four Baghdad Derby clubs (Al-Quwa Al-Jawiya, Al-Shorta, Al-Talaba and Al-Zawraa) finished in the top four.

Name changes
 Al-Bareed renamed to Al-Etisalat wal-Bareed at the end of 2008.

Group stage

Group 1

Results

Group 2

Note: Al-Mosul withdrew from the league.

Results

Championship play-off

|-
!colspan="3"|Third place match

|-
!colspan="3"|Final

Third place match

Final

Match officials
Assistant referees:
Ali Zaidan
Luay Subhi

Match rules
90 minutes.
30 minutes of extra-time if necessary.
Penalty shootout if scores still level.

Final positions

Season statistics

Top scorers

Hat-tricks

References

External links
 Iraq Football Association

Iraqi Premier League seasons
1
Iraq